Roger David Servais (born in 1942 in Liège, Belgium) is a Belgian painter, graphic artist, sculptor and designer

Life 
Roger David Servais spent his childhood in Liège, Brussels and Berlin. In 1961 he began his studies of painting and design at the  School of Art  in West Berlin. When the Soviet sector became segregated by the Berlin Wall, he married his girlfriend Waltraud Kolbow who lived in the eastern part of the city and they moved to Berlin-Prenzlauer Berg (East Berlin). In 1965 their daughter Marguerite was born. As citizen of Belgium he was free to travel and he commuted between Brussels and Berlin, but he endured reprisals from the East German government. His art was prohibited to go on exhibition. He made use of his talents by designing book covers for publishers. By intervention of Baudouin of Belgium, his wife and daughter were allowed to leave the German Democratic Republic in 1973 and settle in Belgium.
In 1974 Roger Davis Servais continued his studies of art at West Berlin's School of Arts, which, in 1963, he had been forced to intermit. His most influential teacher was Otto Hofmann, a former pupil of the Bauhaus. In 1979 he became a member of the Deutscher Künstlerbund. In the 1980s Roger David Servais worked in Belgium, France, Israel, New York City, Sweden and Italy. From 1990 onwards he joined the painter and civil rights activist Bärbel Bohley in her quest to shed light upon oppression and instrumentalization of the arts in the GDR. They both initiated Klaus Schröder's und Hannelore Offner's  book  Eingegrenzt – Ausgegrenzt: Bildende Kunst und Parteiherrschaft in der DDR 1961-1989 (Limited - Excluded: Art and the Party's Control inside the GDR between 1961 and 1989) published by Berliner Akademie Verlag in 2000.
After the death of his wife he married Tosca Schmalenberg in 1998. He lives and works in Berlin and Southern France.

Work  
Roger David Servais can be described as a „European non-conformist“. He is a figurative artist, painter, graphic artist, sculptor and designer who unites opposing techniques in his works - geometric abstraction as well as elements of symbolism and surrealism. His paintings and drawings visualize complex religious, historic and autobiographic statements which are expressed in an indirect and subtle way and are partly encrypted. Single letters play a significant role, hinting at the context rather than identifying it; the colours contribute to the painting's essential meaning, too. The relation of shape and space is a very important element.

Paintings (selection)

Exhibitions (selection) 
 1979–1984: Künstlerbund exhibition, Große Kunstausstellung, Munich
 1981: Neue Darmstädter Secession, Darmstadt
 1983: ADAC exhibition München
 1984: Galerie Slominsky, Mülheim an der Ruhr
 1985: Kunsthaus Hamburg
 1985: Kunstverein Stuttgart
 1986: Galerie Jacob, Oldenburg
 1986: Neue Gruppe München
 1987: Art prize by the City of Kirchheim
 1987: Galerie Lietzow, Berlin
 1990: Künstlerbund exhibition Berlin
 1991: Goethe-Institut, Brüssel
 1991: Galerie Niepel, Düsseldorf
 1992: Usedomer Kunstverein, Galerie Pankow
 1994: Künstlerbund exhibition, Galerie Niepel, Düsseldorf
 1995: Galerie auf Zeit, Berlin
 1999: Jüdische Visionen in Berlin
 2004: Berliner Bank, Berlin
 2005: Galerie Thomas Günther, Berlin
 2009: Kunstpavillon Heringsdorf
 2012: Schaffens(t)räume: Atelierbilder und Künstlermythen in der DDR, Gera
 2016: Roger David Servais: A painter in no man's land between East- and West Berlin 1961-1974, Kommunale Galerie Pankow, Berlin
 2016: Ende vom Lied: Künstlerhaus Bethanien, Berlin

Catalogues  
 1981 Die neue Darmstädter Secession, Darmstadt: Mathildenhöhe Darmstadt
 1983 80 Jahre Deutscher Künstlerbund 1903-1983: 31. Jahresausstellung Berlin: Kunstreport 3 `83, Berlin
 1983 Spuren: Auo-Vision-Galerie: Die ADAC-Sammlung: Auto und Umwelt, Munich 
 1984 Deutscher Künstlerbund: 32. Jahresausstellung Frankfurt: Kunstreport 2 `84 Berlin
 1984 Christine Gaspar: Een knipoog naar de Anekdote. Regenberg, Anton, Claudia Hahn-Raabe, Christine Gaspar, Roswitha Meulemann (ed.): Berlin-Brüssel 1984 Tag für Tag: Ein Rückblick, Goethe-Institut
 1985 Konfrontationen 1,2,3. Exhibition at the Kunsthaus Hamburg from 3 May to 2 June 1985: Michael Eckle, Victor Kraus, Rolf Liese, Renate Sendler-Peters, Arno Backhaus, Michael von Cube, Franz Kochseder, Walter Raum, Jochen Sendler, Horst Hamann, Helga Jahnke, Ernst Heckelmann, Jochen Schimmelpfennig, Roger Servais, Hamburg: Kunsthaus Hamburg
 1987 Roger David Servais: Bilder, Gouachen, Zeichnungen 1967-1987, Berlin: Galerie Lietzow
 1990 Der Deutsche Künstlerbund in Berlin 1990, 38. Jahresausstellung Berlin
 1992 Roger David Servais: Bilder und Gouachen, Berlin: Cultural Office Pankow
 1992 Jüdische Künstler in Berlin, Berlin: Jewish Museum/Berlin-Museum; Martin-Gropius-Bau
 1999 Berlin, Meshulash (editor): DAVKA: Jüdische Visionen in Berlin: Berlin
 2000 Ästhetische Alternativen: Internationale Grafik für das Horst-Janssen-Museum Oldenburg: Donation Jürgen Weichardt, Oldenburg: Isensee
 2012/2013 Schaffens(t)räume: Atelierbilder und Künstlermythen in der ostdeutschen Kunst, Gera: Art Collection Gera, New Orangery
 2016 Roger David Servais: Ein Maler im Niemandsland zwischen Ost und Westberlin,  Berlin: Cultural Office Pankow
 2019 Point of No Return. Wende und Umbruch in der ostdeutschen Kunst / Transformation and Revolution in East German Art, Leipzig, Museum der bildenden Künste

Illustrations, graphics and texts  
1969 Lászlo Bóka: Graf Dénes: Roman.  Linocuts by Roger Servais, Berlin: Verlag Volk und Welt
1970 Horst Lothar Teweleit (ed.): Taufiq al Hakim: Von Wundern und heller Verwunderung und von denen, die es mit Himmel und Hölle halten. Illustrations by Roger Servais, Berlin: Rütten & Loening 
1995 Gerd Henniger: Spiegel im Spiegel. Szenen einer Kindheit. Sechs Radierungen von Roger David Servais, Berlin: Mariannenpresse, .
1987 Sigmar Schollak, Roger Servais (illustrations): Tätowierungen: Aphorismen und Epigramme. Introduction by Günter Kunert, Berlin: Weidler, .
1995 Günter Kunert: Dschamp Nr. 8: Elegien. With screen-printed graphics by Roger David Servais, Berlin: Edition Galerie auf Zeit
1999 Ulrich Tarlatt (ed.): Die Farbe Schwarz – Hommage a Philipp Otto Runge Halle: edition Augenweide
2002 Thomas Günther (ed.): Günter Kunert (texts), Roger David Servais (illustrations): Vertrieben aus Eden, Berlin, Edition Galerie auf Zeit
2003 Henryk  Bereska: Burgschreiber zu Beeskow: Märkische Streifbilder, Berlin: Aphaia Verlag 2003, .
2009 Roger David Servais: Erinnerungen an Robert Rehfeldt, in: Lutz Wohlrab (ed.): Robert Rehfeldt: Kunst im Kontakt, Berlin: Wohlrab,  p. 27, .

Works  
Works by Roger David Servais can be found in private and public collections, e. g.: 
National Gallery (Berlin)
Kupferstichkabinett Berlin
Jewish Museum, Berlin
Royal Museums of Fine Arts of Belgium
Jewish Museum of Belgium
Royal Library of Belgium
Kupferstich-Kabinett, Dresden
Kunstsammlung des Westdeutschen Rundfunks, Cologne
Kunstsammlung des ADAC, Munich
Princeton University

External links 
List of membership: Deutscher Künstlerbund
Roger David Servais | A painter in no man's land between East- and West Berlin 1961-1974

References

1942 births
Living people
Belgian painters
Belgian graphic designers
Belgian sculptors
Artists from Berlin